The women's water polo at the 2014 Asian Games was held in Dream Park Aquatics Center, Incheon, Korea from 20 September to 24 September 2014. China won the round robin competition and the gold medal. Japan, which tied with Kazakhstan in both competition points and their head-to-head match, was awarded the silver medal based on having better head-to-head result against the highest ranked team China.

Squads

Results
All times are Korea Standard Time (UTC+09:00)

Final standing

References

External links
Official website

Water polo at the 2014 Asian Games